John Pierpoint (January 10, 1805 – January 7, 1882) was a Vermont attorney and judge.  He served as a justice of the Vermont Supreme Court from 1857 until his death, and was Chief Justice beginning in 1865.

Biography
John Pierpoint (sometimes spelled Pierpont) was born in Litchfield, Connecticut on January 10, 1805, the son of Daniel and Sarah (Phelps) Pierpoint.  Sarah Phelps Pierpoint was the aunt of Samuel S. Phelps, who served in the United States Senate.  In 1815, Pierpoint moved to Rutland, Vermont to live with his brother Robert Pierpoint, who served as Lieutenant Governor of Vermont from 1848 to 1849.

Pierpoint was educated in Rutland, studied at the Litchfield Law School in 1825 and 1826, and was admitted to the bar in 1827.  He practiced in Pittsford until 1832, when he relocated to Vergennes.  In 1834, Pierpoint received an honorary degree (Master of Arts) from Middlebury College.

After a period of ill health in 1834 and 1835, Pierpoint moved to Fayette, Mississippi to recuperate; he lived there for two years before returning to Vergennes.  Initially a Democrat opposed to slavery, he was Addison County's Register of Probate from 1836 to 1857.  From 1841 to 1842, Pierpoint served in the Vermont House of Representatives.  He was a member of the Vermont State Senate from 1855 to 1857, and served as chairman of the Judiciary Committee in 1856 and 1857.  He later became a member of the Free Soil Party, and joined the Republican Party when it was founded in the mid-1850s as the main anti-slavery party in the United States.

In 1857, the Vermont General Assembly chose Pierpoint to serve as an associate justice of the Vermont Supreme Court, following an expansion of the court from three justices to six.  He served until 1865, when he was elevated to chief justice, succeeding Luke P. Poland.  Piepoint served as chief justice until his death, and was succeeded by Homer E. Royce.  In 1871 he received the honorary degree of LL.D. from Middlebury College.

Death and burial
Pierpoint died in Vergennes on January 7, 1882.  He was buried at Prospect Cemetery in Vergennes.

Family
In 1838, Pierpoint married Sarah Maria Lawrence (1817-1884), the daughter of Vilee Lawrence of Vergennes.  They were the parents of seven children.  A son and two daughters survived him, all of whom resided in Chicago.

References

Sources

Books

Internet

1805 births
1882 deaths
Politicians from Litchfield, Connecticut
People from Vergennes, Vermont
Litchfield Law School alumni
Vermont lawyers
Vermont Democrats
Vermont Free Soilers
Vermont Republicans
Members of the Vermont House of Representatives
Vermont state senators
Justices of the Vermont Supreme Court
Burials in Vermont
19th-century American judges
19th-century American lawyers